Karski might refer to:
 Karski, alias used by Polish socialist Julian Marchlewski (1866–1925)
 Jan Karski (1914–2000), Polish resistance leader
 Karol Karski (born 1966), Polish politician
 Karski, Poland, a village in Greater Poland Voivodeship

See also
 Karksi, Estonia